G. Ernest Fairweather was a prominent Canadian architect. While also he built residential structures, he is best known for his commercial buildings.

Buildings

Saint John
 200 - 206 Germain Street 
 114 and 116 Wentworth Street 
 Carnegie Building, one of the Carnegie libraries (1904), current home of the Saint John Arts Centre.
 Seaman's Mission, 152 Prince William (1908)[www.travelphotobase.com/c/NBJ/NBJ301.HTM]
 Old City Hall, 116 Prince William [www.travelphotobase.com/c/NBJ/NBJ272.HTM]
 King Edward VII Memorial Bandstand (two story)(1902)

Woodstock
 L. P. Fisher Public Library

Rothesay
 Memorial Chapel, Rothesay Netherwood School (1923) F. DeLancey Robinson also

Fredericton
 Old Civil Engineering Building at the University of New Brunswick Fredericton Campus (1900)
 Gymnasium at the University of New Brunswick Fredericton Campus (1906)

 171 Chuch Street, Fredericton, a heritage designated residence designed by G. Ernst Fairweather in the Beaux Arts architectural style and built in 1906 for Dr. William Crockett contains impressive woodwork, large arched doorways, high ceilings and the City’s most stunning stained glass windows.

References

External links
 https://web.archive.org/web/20051025210306/http://www.saintjohnartscentre.com/heritage.html
 Historic Places in Canada

1850 births
1920 deaths
19th-century Canadian architects
Members of the Royal Canadian Academy of Arts